Spur Gasoline Station, at 201 E. Bridge St. in Cynthiana, Kentucky, was built in 1925.  It was listed on the National Register of Historic Places in 1987.

References

National Register of Historic Places in Harrison County, Kentucky
Neoclassical architecture in Kentucky
Commercial buildings completed in 1925
1925 establishments in Kentucky
Transportation in Harrison County, Kentucky
Gas stations on the National Register of Historic Places in Kentucky
Cynthiana, Kentucky